The Cambambe Hydroelectric Power Station is a hydroelectric power plant across the Kwanza River at the border between Cuanza Norte Province and Bengo Province in Angola.

Location
The geographical coordinates of the power station are:09°45'12.0"S, 14°28'51.0"E (Latitude:-9.753333; Longitude:14.480833).

Overview
The construction of Cambambe 1 Dam was started on October 7, 1959 and finished in 1963. Due to wear and tear as well as lack of maintenance, by 2002, output had fallen from 180 megawatts to approximately 80 megawatts.

In April 2007, a consortium comprising Odebrecht, Voith, Alstom and Engevix, was hired by the  Empresa Nacional de Electricidade, to carry out the project of rehabilitation, expansion and modernization of the dam and power station. The project includes  the heightening of the structure by 30 meters, the modernization of the generating units of the Cambambe 1, replacing the four 45 MW turbines by four 65 MW turbines, and the construction of a new plant, called Cambambe 2, with four generating units of 175 MW each, for a total of 700 MW. The works in Cambambe 1 started in March, 2009 and in Cambambe 2 in 2013.

Construction
In July 2015, it was anticipated that the first 175 megawatts turbine of Cambambe II, would be installed and come online in June 2016, with completion expected in 2017.

Other upgrades included the construction of three new energy transformation substations, with capacities 400KV, 220KV and 60KV, to support connection between Cambambe 1 and 2, Capanda Hydroelectric Power Station and Laúca Hydroelectric Power Station. The renovation and upgrade of Cambambe 1 and the construction of Cambambe 2, cost an estimated US$2 billion.

The completed power station was commissioned on 27 July 2017, in front of 500 invited guests.

See also
 List of power stations in Angola

References

External links
 Renovations to Cambambe Hydroelectric Power Station As of 13 June 2015.

Dams in Angola
Power stations in Angola
Hydroelectric power stations in Angola
Dams on the Cuanza River
Dams completed in 1963
Energy infrastructure completed in 1963
1963 establishments in Angola